Hospital de Especialidades Carlos Andrade Marín also known as HCAM or HECAM, is a teaching hospital in Quito, Ecuador, managed by the Instituto Ecuatoriano de Seguridad Social (IESS). The hospital is located in the center of Quito. It offers full services to those covered by social security.

References

External links
 Hospital Carlos Andrade Marín Official Website 
 Instituto Ecuatoriano de Seguridad Social Official Website
 Hospital Location

Hospitals in Ecuador
Medical education in Ecuador
Teaching hospitals
Buildings and structures in Quito
Hospitals with year of establishment missing